The Carolina RailHawks launched their inaugural season on April 21, 2007, in front of a crowd of 6,327 at SAS Soccer Park in Cary, North Carolina when they drew 1–1 with the Minnesota Thunder in their first official regular season match. Midfielder Kupono Low scored the first goal in franchise history when he blasted 24-yard left-footed shot past Thunder keeper Joe Warren in the 8th minute of the inaugural match. On May 8, 2007, the RailHawks earned their first franchise victory 2–0 against Chivas USA in an exhibition match.

On August 14, 2007, with a 3–0 victory over the Charleston Battery, the Carolina RailHawks secured their first piece of silverware, the 2007 Southern Derby Cup, with one match remaining in the contest.  The RailHawks finished their first USL-1 season in 8th place in the league table, securing the league's final playoff spot on the last day of the regular season with a 2–0 victory away over fellow expansion franchise the California Victory.  The RailHawks were eliminated from the playoff quarterfinals by the eventual league champion Seattle Sounders.

2007 Competitions

2007 squad 

Transfers:  OUT - Sola Abolaji to Vancouver Whitecaps (7/27/2007); IN - Joel John Bailey from Vancouver Whitecaps (7/27/2007)

2007 Staff 
Coach -  Scott Schweitzer
Assistant Coach -  Damon Nahas
Assistant Coach -  Mark Girard Oldest coach in the usa
Goalkeeping Coach -  David Noyes
Equipment Manager -  Steven Economides
Trainer -  Elise Caceres

2007 Schedule 

^ Televised nationally on Fox Soccer Channel

^^ Southern Derby fixtures

^^^ U.S. Open Cup fixtures

^^^^ USL-1 Playoffs fixtures

References 

North Carolina FC seasons
Carolina Railhawks
Carolina RailHawks